Quintela may refer to:

Places
Mones Quintela, town in northern Uruguay
Quintela, parish in Sernancelhe, Portugal
Quintela de Azurara, parish in Mangualde, Portugal
Quintela de Lampaças, parish in Bragança, Portugal
Quintela de Leirado, municipality in Galicia, Spain

People
Alfredo Mones Quintela, Uruguayan agricultural engineer, namesake of the town of Mones Quintela
Carlos M. Quintela, Cuban film director of La Piscina (2012)
Eduardo Quintela, musician, husband of Christine McVie and songwriter with her for Fleetwood Mac
Fernando Henrique Quintela Cavalcante (aka Nando, born 1990), Brazilian footballer
Inácio da Costa Quintela (1763–1838), Portuguese naval officer, historian, poet and politician
Joaquim Pedro Quintela, 1st Baron of Quintela (1748–1817), Portuguese businessman and landowner
Joaquim Pedro Quintela, 1st Count of Farrobo (1801–1869), Portuguese aristocrat and businessman
José Diogo Quintela, Portuguese comedian
Manuel Quintela, Uruguayan doctor, namesake of Hospital de Clínicas "Dr. Manuel Quintela"
Óscar Francisco García Quintela (aka Pinchi, born 1996), Spanish footballer
Pedro Ricardo Quintela Henriques (born 1974), Portuguese footballer
Peregrina Quintela Estévez (born 1960), Spanish mathematician
Silvia Quintela (1948 – c. 1977), disappeared Argentine doctor
Teresita Quintela (born 1950), Argentine politician